The men's individual sabre fencing event at the 2017 Summer Universiade was held 20 August at the Taipei Nangang Exhibition Center in Taipei, Taiwan.

Pool Results

Pool 1

Pool 2

Pool 3

Pool 4

Pool 5

Pool 6

Pool 7

Pool 8

Pool 9

Pool 10

Pool 11

Ranking Round

Section 1

Section 2

Section 3

Section 4

Quarterfinals

Final ranking

References 

Fencing at the 2017 Summer Universiade